Mamadou Gaye is a Senegalese basketball coach. He coached the Senegalese national team at the 2016 Summer Olympics, where the team finished twelfth.

References

Year of birth missing (living people)
Living people
Basketball at the 2016 Summer Olympics – Women's tournament
Basketball coaches
Senegalese men's basketball players
Senegalese sportsmen